Nagal Soti is a village in India. It is located in the Najibabad block, Bijnor district of the state of Uttar Pradesh. Nagal Soti belongs to the Moradabad division, which is located 34 km north of the district headquarters of Bijnor, 15 km from Najibabad, and 483 km from the state capital of Lucknow.

Demographics
The current population of Nagal Soti is estimated to be 6,576. 47% of the village inhabitants are women and 53% are men. There are 1,124 houses and the most commonly spoken language in the village is Hindi.

Transport
The nearest railway station is located in Chandok and Balawali.

Education
There are several educational institutions in Nagal Soti including:
S4 International School
Raja Bharat Singh Inter College
Saraswati Shishu Mandir, an affiliate of the Vidya Bharati which runs one of the largest private network of schools in India.
Spring Field Academy
Lala Amichand Junior High School

Nearby villages
 Khanpur (1 km) 
 Jeetpur Khas (3 km)
 Harchandpur (4 km)
 Raipur Khas (4 km)
 Rasoolpur Said (4 km) 
 Kanshi Rampur (5 km)
 Shahzadpur Carrie Ville (1 km)

References

External links
Nagal Soti News
Nagal Soti on wikimapia

Villages in Bijnor district